Ronald Jackson may refer to:

 Ron Jackson (baseball, born 1933) (1933–2008), American baseball player
 Ron Jackson (born 1953), coach and former player in Major League Baseball
 Ron Jackson (jazz musician) (born 1964), American jazz guitarist
 Ron Jackson Jr. (born 1997), American basketball player
 Ronald Shannon Jackson (1940–2013), American jazz drummer
 Ronald L. Jackson II (born 1970), American academic and author
 Ronald Jackson (bishop), American Anglican bishop
 Ronny Jackson (born 1967), U.S. Congressman and former presidential physician
 Lil' Ronnie (born Ronnie Jackson), American record producer
 Ronald Jackson (Dead Rising character), fictional character in the video game Dead Rising 3
 Ronnie Jackson, fictional character in the 1947 American romantic comedy film My Favorite Brunette